Celine or Céline is a family and feminine given name.

Celine or Céline may also refer to:

People 

 Louis-Ferdinand Céline, French writer

Places
 Celine, Krško, a small settlement in the Krško municipality in Slovenia

Croatia
 Celine, Jastrebarsko, a village in Zagreb County, belonging to the wider area of the town of Jastrebarsko
 Celine, Međimurje County, a village in the Podturen municipality in Međimurje County
 Celine, Vrbovec, a village in Zagreb County, belonging to the wider area of the town of Vrbovec
 Celine Goričke, a village in the Marija Gorica municipality in Zagreb County
 Celine Samoborske, a village in Zagreb County, belonging to the wider area of the town of Samobor

Film  and television
 Céline (1992 film), French drama film directed by Jean-Claude Brisseau
 Céline (2008 film), TV biopic on singer Céline Dion directed by Jeff Woolnough
Celine: Through the Eyes of the World, 2010 documentary-concert film about Celine Dion
 Celine and Julie Go Boating (Céline et Julie vont en bateau), a 1974 French film directed by Jacques Rivette
 Celine, the dog belonging to fictional drama teacher Mr G from the series Summer Heights High
 Celine, fictional character in the Alien Nation television series

Other
 "Céline", song by Hugues Aufray 1967
 "Celine", a poem by Patti Smith from her 1972 book Seventh Heaven
 Celine (brand), a French luxury house owned by LVMH
 Celine (concert residency), a concert residency by Celine Dion in Las Vegas
 Hagbard Celine, an important character in the Illuminatus trilogy of books.

See also

 Celina (disambiguation)
 Selina (disambiguation)